Bhagwati Prashad Singh was a Nepalese judge who served as 4th Chief Justice of Nepal, in office from 9 April 1964 to 10 July 1970. He was appointed by the then-king of Nepal, Mahendra.

Singh was preceded by Hari Prasad Pradhan and succeeded by Ratna Bahadur Bista.

References 

Chief justices of Nepal
Possibly living people
Year of birth missing